"What About Tomorrows Children" is a pop song by Scottish singer Maggie Reilly. It was released by Empire Records as the first single from her debut studio album Echoes (1992). The song was produced by Harald Steinhauer and Kristian Schultze. The single peaked at number thirty on Dutch Singles Chart.

Formats and track listings
CD / 7" Single
"What About Tomorrows Children" – 4:13
"Nowhere to Hide" – 5:00

Charts

References

1991 singles
Maggie Reilly songs
1991 songs